Ellen Karlsson (born 3 June 1994) is a Swedish football defender who plays currently for Piteå IF in the Damallsvenskan.

Honours 
KIF Örebro DFF
Runner-up
 Damallsvenskan: 2014

References

External links 
 
 Sweden player profile
 KIF Örebro player profile
 

1994 births
Living people
Swedish women's footballers
Jitex BK players
KIF Örebro DFF players
Damallsvenskan players
Women's association football defenders